David Hurley (born August 1962) is a British countertenor who sang with The King's Singers from 1990 to 2016.

Hurley was a chorister at Winchester Cathedral, and a choral scholar at Winchester College and New College, Oxford. He became a mainstay in the British countertenor scene shortly after becoming a King's Singer. Hurley sang countertenor with the likes of Alastair Hume, Nigel Short, Robin Tyson and Timothy Wayne-Wright. As well as with these countertenors, he sang with Bob Chilcott, Paul Phoenix, Julian Gregory, Bruce Russell, Philip Lawson, Chris Bruerton, Christopher Gabbitas, Gabriel Crouch, Stephen Connolly and Jonathan Howard.

Hurley recorded, along with Tyson, Phoenix, Lawson, Gabbitas and Connolly, the 40-part piece Spem in Alium by Thomas Tallis (2006), as well as the Grammy Award winning album "Simple Gifts" (2008).

References

Living people
English tenors
Countertenors
21st-century English singers
20th-century English singers
Place of birth missing (living people)
20th-century British male singers
21st-century British male singers
1962 births
Choristers of New College, Oxford